This is a list of adult channels that feature adult content, in the sense of erotica or pornography.

List of adult channels

 40+ – UK (40+, Couples, Hookups)
 AOV Adult Movie Channel – Canada
 Arouse – North America
 BangU. – US (formerly SKiN TV, Shorteez & Spice 2)
 Babes and Brazzers – UK
 Babestation – UK
 Beate-Uhse.TV – Germany
 Brazzers TV – US (formerly Fresh! & Spice), New Zealand (formerly Spice:Xcess)
 Brazzers TV Europe – UK
 Dorcel TV – France/Netherlands
 Dorcel TV Canada – Canada
 Dusk! – Netherlands
 Exxxtasy TV – Canada
 Hot Choice - US
 Hustler TV (Europe) – Netherlands
 Hustler TV (US) – US
 Hustler HD 3D – Italy
 Maleflixxx Television – Canada
 Mofos – US (formerly Xcess & Hot Zone)
 Pink TV – France
 Playmen TV – Canada
 Penthouse TV (Canada) – Canada
 Penthouse TV – US
 Penthouse HD – UK
 Pink TV (US) – US
 Playboy TV – US
 Playmen TV – Canada
 Red Hot TV (Canada) – Canada
 RKTV – US (formerly ClubJenna & The Hot Network)
 Sexy Hot – Brazil
 SexySat TV - Brazil/Netherlands/Slovakia
 Skinemax HD – Canada
 SmileTV – UK
 Spice Channel – UK
 SpiceTV HD – Korea
 TEN Networks – US (Blox, Blue, Clips, Freaky, Juicy, Real, SexSee, TEN, VaVoom, XTSY)
 Television X – UK
 Vivid TV – US
 Vivid TV Europe – Europe
 Vixen TV – Canada
 XMO – Netherlands
 XXX Action Clips Channel – Canada
 XXL – France

Television pornography
Pornographic television channels
Lists of television channels by content